Fauquembergues is a commune in the Pas-de-Calais department in the Hauts-de-France region of France. First mentioned in 961 as "in monten qui dicitur Falcoberg", the place later in 1124 was called Falkenberga. In 1347, an English raiding force under Henry of Grosmont razed the settlement to the ground.

Geography
A town situated 10 miles (16 km) southwest of Saint-Omer, at the junction of the D928 with two minor roads, the D92 and the D158. The river Aa flows through Fauquembergues.

Population

Places and monuments
 A line of 13 electricity-generating turbines can be seen on the 100 m high hills. Another group of 12 turbines faces the town from the southern direction.
 The 13th-century church of Saint-Léger which is a registered historical monument

Notable people
 Hugh of Falkenberg, 12th century (Hugues de Fauquembergues)
 Pierre-Alexandre Monsigny (1729–1817), composer

See also
Communes of the Pas-de-Calais department

References

Communes of Pas-de-Calais